Elasmia is a genus of moths of the family Notodontidae.

Species
Elasmia cave Metzler, 2011
Elasmia insularis (Grote, 1866)
Elasmia mandela (Druce, 1887)
Elasmia packardii (Morrison, 1875)

References

Notodontidae
Moth genera
Taxa named by Heinrich Benno Möschler